The unification of Albania and Kosovo is a political idea, revived after Kosovo declared independence in 2008. This idea has been connected to the irredentist concept of Greater Albania. As of the 2021 census, approximately 97% of Kosovars are ethnic Albanians.

History
During the 1981 protests in Kosovo, Yugoslavia feared a potential unification of Kosovo with Albania. In the early 1990s, Albanian politicians' statements were often contradictory on the possibility. Political activist Ukshin Hoti, founder of the Party of Albanian National Union, who disappeared while in Serbian police custody in 1999, was an ardent supporter of the unification of Kosovo with Albania. In 2001, Arben Imami, a politician from the Democratic Party of Albania, stated that unification of Kosovo with Albania should be a party goal, but this statement was met with criticism within his own party.

The Ahtisaari Plan conditioned Kosovo's independence by adopting a multiethnic “Kosovar,” rather than an Albanian identity. Still, Gallup surveys revealed that 75% of Kosovo Albanians would prefer to live unified with Albania in a single country. The same support was seen in Albania where 68% of the citizens of Albania preferred a unification of Albania with Kosovo. In 2017, some mainstream Albanian politicians, such as Ben Blushi, have come out in support of unification. In Kosovo, the political party Vetëvendosje supports unification. A political union between the two states may bring Albania into diplomatic conflict with Serbia, which regards Kosovo as its de jure territory.

In May 2019, president Hashim Thaçi suggested a referendum on the unification of Kosovo and Albania, if the slow integration process by the European Union does not accelerate. However, some simply view this as an attempt by Thaçi to “keep himself in the spotlight”, without any real intention of uniting the two countries.

Public opinion 

Polls supporting unification of Kosovo with Albania notwithstanding, the goal of Albanian politicians has been entrance into NATO and the European Union, rather than national unification. Some Roman Catholic and Orthodox Christian Albanians fear that any possible unification of Balkan areas that bring sizable numbers of Muslims into the new state may lead to an increasing "Muslimization" of Albania.

According to a 2019 poll by Open Society Foundations that covered 2,504 respondents in both countries, 79.4% of Kosovar Albanian respondents were in favor of unification between Albania and Kosovo, compared to 82.9% of the respondents in Albania. When asked whether they would be willing to pay a tax for unification, 66.1% of respondents in Kosovo agreed, compared to 45.5% in Albania.

A Euronews Albania Barometer poll in 2021 showed 79.2% of Albanians in Albania supporting unification with Kosovo.

According to a December 2022 survey by UBO Consulting, 60% of Kosovar citizens were pro-unification.

See also

Albanian nationalism
Greater Albania
Partition of Kosovo

Notes

References

External links
Albania and Kosovo to unite, inside EU or not: Albanian PM

Albanian irredentism
Albanian nationalism in Kosovo
Albania and Kosovo
Political movements in Albania
Political movements in Kosovo
Albania–Kosovo relations
Proposed political unions
Public policy proposals